Cecinothofagus gallaelenga is a species of gall wasp. Cecinothofagus species are thought to be parasitoids or lethal inhabitants of galls induced by species of Aditrochus on Nothofagus.

References

Further reading

Polidori, Carlo, and José L. Nieves-Aldrey. "Diverse Filters to Sense: Great Variability of Antennal Morphology and Sensillar Equipment in Gall-Wasps (Hymenoptera: Cynipidae)." (2014): e101843.
Polidori, Carlo, Alberto Jorge García, and José L. Nieves-Aldrey. "Breaking up the wall: metal-enrichment in ovipositors, but not in mandibles, co-varies with substrate hardness in gall-wasps and their associates." PLoS ONE 8.7 (2013): e70529.

External links

Cynipidae
Gall-inducing insects
Insects described in 2009